The 1959–60 Ohio State Buckeyes men's basketball team is the only basketball team to win a national title in Ohio State history. They were coached by Hall of Fame coach Fred Taylor and had three future Hall of Famers on their roster—center Jerry Lucas, forward John Havlicek, and reserve forward Bob Knight, who entered the Hall for his storied coaching career, most notably at Indiana.

Roster

Season summary
Coach Fred Taylor started two sophomores at the beginning of the season, Lucas and Mel Nowell, with returnees Joe Roberts, Larry Siegfried and Dick Furry. An injury to Furry got Havlicek inserted into that first game, and he started thereafter.

In this era, freshman could not play varsity college basketball. The recruiting class of Lucas, Nowell, Havlicek, Knight, and Gary Gearhart were not eligible to lead the Buckeyes until 1959–60. This was their first college season of play as the game is considered today.

The 1959–60 team posted the best shooting, highest-scoring team in college basketball that season at over 90 points per game. The key to the attack was the rebounding and outlet passing of Lucas. The other four athletes routinely overwhelmed opponents with fast break baskets. In 1960, this kind of offensive play was then the cutting edge of the game, and a big reason why all five starters were later drafted into the NBA. There were only eight NBA teams at this time, so this was not an easy feat.

Lucas shot a then-record 63% from the floor that season in an era when some college starters commonly shot 35% from the floor. More than just a great rebounder, he also had a great shooting eye from as far out as 25 feet (there was no three-point line then), and also had a hook shot that was nearly automatic. While the statistic was not well-kept then, Lucas probably led this team in assists, at 5–6 per game, he was an outstanding passer as well. He came very close to leading the country in both individual scoring and rebounding as well as shooting. After the outstanding Lucas, the Bucks may have had the best backcourt in the country in Siegfried and Nowell. Siegfried was then rated very highly as an all-around guard at both ends of the court. With Havlicek looked to contribute to the great offensive team with his hustling defense, Siegfried became active this season in this area as well and was outstanding. Nowell had one-on-one playground skills that were well-developed and effective immediately that season. With three sophomores now starting, Ohio State did have two early-season losses to Utah and Kentucky, but then clicked through the rest of the schedule. A late-season loss to Indiana came after they had clinched the Big Ten.

The Buckeyes steamrolled through the NCAA tournament by an average of 19.5 points a game, dusting off California 75–55 in the final behind two future NBA stars, Jerry Lucas and John Havlicek, two excellent guards in Larry Siegfried and Mel Nowell and a defensive work ethic that limited opponents to .388 shooting over the course of the season. While the offensive star power of the team is very noteworthy, it is important to say that the team was also very well-coached. After Hall of Famer Taylor, Graf had coached at Harvard and was very strong on defense. Truitt later led as a college coach at several NCAA schools.

NCAA basketball tournament
Mideast
Ohio State 98, Western Kentucky 79
Ohio State 86, Georgia Tech 69
Final Four
Ohio State 76, NYU 54
Ohio State 75, California 55

NCAA Basketball Championship
In that game, the Buckeyes shooting was off the charts, but it was also defense that won them the championship. Lucas gave Darrall Imhoff room only when he was far away from the basket; in close, he was always between Imhoff and the ball. Still, very few in the noisy capacity audience at the Cow Palace -most of them, to be sure, California partisans- were ready to concede defeat to the Big Ten champions. Often enough in the past, California had come from behind to win on the wings of its mistake-inducing press. Pete Newell brought his team back into play in the second half, with a crushing defense and within five minutes, Cal scored 10 points to Ohio State's 5. Ironically, though, it was this fanatical defense that eventually proved to be Cal's undoing. Covering on the Ohio State man with the ball, the Bears were obliged to uncover a free man somewhere else. After a short period of fumbling, Ohio State began to find him. Two or three furiously quick breaks with more than five minutes to go destroyed California for good. When the flurry was over, Ohio State's shooting percentage was a remarkable 67.4 percent, and its victory margin was the largest in the 22-year history of the NCAA finals.

Rankings

Awards and honors
 Jerry Lucas, NCAA Men's MOP Award
 Jerry Lucas, All-America selection
 Jerry Lucas, Chicago Tribune Silver Basketball
 Jerry Lucas, First-Team All Big Ten

Team players drafted in the NBA

References

Ohio State Buckeyes
Ohio State Buckeyes men's basketball seasons
NCAA Division I men's basketball tournament championship seasons
NCAA Division I men's basketball tournament Final Four seasons
Ohio State
Ohio State Buckeyes
Ohio State Buckeyes